Astroworld may refer to:
 Six Flags AstroWorld, a former theme park in Houston, Texas, U.S.
 Astroworld (album), a 2018 album by American rapper Travis Scott named after the theme park
 Astroworld Festival, an annual music festival organized by Scott and held adjacent to the theme park site
 Astroworld Festival crowd crush, a 2021 crowd crush incident, which resulted in the deaths of 10 people

See also